Leptocypris taiaensis is a species of cyprinid fish endemic to Taia River, Little Scarcies River and Waanje River in Sierre Leone.

References

Leptocypris
Danios
Fish of Africa
Fish described in 1989